Cerro Agassiz is a mountain in the mountain range of the Andes, located in the border between Argentina and Chile, in the region of Patagonia.

References

Agassiz
Agassiz
Mountains of Magallanes Region
Landforms of Santa Cruz Province, Argentina
Argentina–Chile border
Agassiz
Agassiz